The Chetwai Lighthouse is situated at Chettuva near Guruvayur in Thrissur District of Kerala. It was inaugurated on 29 September 1986. The tower is a 30-meter tall concrete structure. There did not exist any lighthouse earlier to the present one at this place. The light source was changed on 30 April 2003.

See also 

 List of lighthouses in India

References

External links 

 
 Directorate General of Lighthouses and Lightships

Lighthouses in Kerala
Buildings and structures in Thrissur district
Transport in Thrissur district
Lighthouses completed in 1986
1986 establishments in Kerala
Guruvayur